Top Chef: Portland is the eighteenth season of the American reality television series Top Chef. It was first announced by Bravo on September 28, 2020. The season was filmed in Portland, Oregon, and surrounding areas, including the Hood River Fruit Loop, Columbia River Gorge, Mount Hood, Tillamook Bay, Tualatin Valley, and Willamette Valley wine country. The winner received .

Numerous production changes were made in response to COVID-19, and the pandemic's impact on the food industry became a running theme throughout the season. Due to the difficulty of bringing in guest judges and diners for individual episodes while observing pandemic safety protocols, in addition to series mainstays Tom Colicchio, Gail Simmons, and Padma Lakshmi, the season features a rotating judging and dining panel consisting of various Top Chef alumni.

Top Chef: Portland premiered on April 1, 2021, and concluded on July 1, 2021. In the season finale, Gabe Erales was declared the winner over runners-up Shota Nakajima and Dawn Burrell. Nakajima was voted Fan Favorite.

Production
Production ran from early September through late October 2020. In response to COVID-19, a comprehensive health and safety plan was developed by Bravo and Magical Elves Productions in accordance with CDC guidelines, state and local orders, and safety policies from NBCUniversal. According to Magical Elves Productions co-CEO Casey Kriley, the company spent six months planning how to film during the pandemic. The cast and production crew, totaling around 150 people, were kept isolated in a bubble, similar to those used for sporting events, at the Kimpton Hotel Monaco Portland. They were tested for the coronavirus every other day. Due to the size of the production crew, the departments were broken up into separate zones that worked at different times. 

Sanitation protocols were changed. The judges were not allowed to share plates of food; tasting spoons had to be discarded after every taste; and contestants were each given their own individual spice containers, instead of sharing them. Other production changes included curbside pickup and delivery from Whole Foods Market instead of in-store shopping; the exclusion of challenges involving large dinners, tasting events, and crowds; as well as a bigger kitchen set and judges' table to allow for more social distancing. According to Colicchio and Simmons, nobody became ill during filming.

The producers were committed to their decision to go with Portland, Oregon, as a host for Top Chef, despite ongoing civil unrest in the city including protests over the police killings of George Floyd and Breonna Taylor. While the show was able to avoid the protests, which were largely concentrated to downtown Portland, the producers did not anticipate the effects of the 2020 Oregon wildfires, which "[threw] a massive curveball" into the production schedule. At times, the producers were unable to shoot outdoors, or even indoors, due to the smoke caused by the wildfires, forcing them to shift the schedule and filming locations around.

Contestants
Fifteen chefs were selected to compete in Top Chef: Portland. The cast consists entirely of executive chefs and restaurant owners, and is the first season of Top Chef to not include any sous-chefs among the competitors.

Dawn Burrell returned to compete in Top Chef: World All-Stars.

Contestant progress

: The chef(s) did not receive immunity for winning the Quickfire Challenge.
: Following Episode 5 of Last Chance Kitchen, Jamie returned to the competition.
: Due to the tournament-style format of the Elimination Challenge in Episode 10, no top or bottom dishes were determined. The winner of each round was declared safe, while the loser of the final round was eliminated.
: Since the judges could not decide on a losing dish, all three chefs moved forward to the finale.
 (WINNER) The chef won the season and was crowned "Top Chef".
 (RUNNER-UP) The chef was a runner-up for the season.
 (WIN) The chef won the Elimination Challenge.
 (HIGH) The chef was selected as one of the top entries in the Elimination Challenge, but did not win.
 (IN) The chef was not selected as one of the top or bottom entries in the Elimination Challenge and was safe.
 (LOW) The chef was selected as one of the bottom entries in the Elimination Challenge, but was not eliminated.
 (OUT) The chef lost the Elimination Challenge.

Episodes

Last Chance Kitchen

Controversy
In December 2020, about a month after filming ended in Portland, Gabe Erales, who would end up winning the competition, was fired from his executive chef position at Comedor in Austin. The day after the finale aired, the Austin American-Statesman reported that Erales "admitted to having a consensual sexual relationship" with a female coworker at Comedor in the summer of 2020. He later reduced the employee's work hours "based on her performance," Erales said, while he "continued to communicat[e] with her in an unprofessional manner." Philip Speer, his former business partner and chef at Comedor, confirmed that Erales was terminated due to "repeated violations of the company's ethics policy as it relates to harassment of women." Erales apologized on Instagram for his behavior, while the show declined to comment. Hostess and fellow producer Padma Lakshmi finally spoke on that matter. "As someone who has been sexually harassed, this topic is a serious one and merits openness," Lakshmi wrote at the time. "We filmed Top Chef in October of last year & were not aware of the allegations now coming out about Gabe. This should be investigated & the network should consider its best action." She added that "no one has alleged sexual harassment on the record or otherwise to Bravo/Top Chef and we judges didn't have any indication of inappropriate behavior from Gabe during his time on set."

References
Notes

Footnotes

External links
 Official website

Top Chef
Television shows set in Oregon
Television shows filmed in Oregon
2021 American television seasons